The women's team sprint competition at the 2014 Asian Games was held on 20 September at the Incheon International Velodrome.

Schedule
All times are Korea Standard Time (UTC+09:00)

Results

Qualifying

Finals

Bronze

Gold

References 
Results

External links 
Official website

Track Men Team sprint